Ilse Kubaschewski (1907–2001) was a German film producer. She became one of the prominent figures in the post-war German film industry after setting up the distribution company Gloria Film in 1949.

References

Bibliography
 Bergfelder, Tim. International Adventures: German Popular Cinema and European Co-Productions in the 1960s. Berghahn Books, 2005.

External links

1907 births
2001 deaths
German film producers
Film people from Berlin
Officers Crosses of the Order of Merit of the Federal Republic of Germany